Joël Bettin (born 6 July 1959) is a French sprint canoer who competed in the late 1980s and early 1990s. At the 1988 Summer Olympics in Seoul, he won a bronze in the C-2 500 m event.

Bettin also won three medals at the ICF Canoe Sprint World Championships with a silver (C-4 500 m: 1991) and two bronzes (C-2 500 m and C-4 500 m: both 1989).

References

Sports-reference.com profile

Sportspeople from Melun
1959 births
Canoeists at the 1988 Summer Olympics
French male canoeists
Living people
Olympic canoeists of France
Olympic bronze medalists for France
Olympic medalists in canoeing
ICF Canoe Sprint World Championships medalists in Canadian
Medalists at the 1988 Summer Olympics
20th-century French people
21st-century French people